Rodrigo Martin Cariaga (born 15 December 1981) is an Argentine former footballer who is last known to have played as a midfielder for Tarxien Rainbows.

Career

Cariaga started his career with Argentine second division side Juventud Antoniana, where he made 2 league appearances and scored 0 goals.

In 2003, he signed for Atlético Veragüense in Panama.

In 2004, Cariaga signed for Argentine third division club General Paz Juniors, where he made 24 league appearances and scored 0 goals.

In 2005, he signed for Sportivo Belgrano in the Argentine fourth division.

In 2008, Cariaga signed for Maltese team Tarxien Rainbows.

Personal life

He is the son of former footballer Mario Cariaga.

References

External links
 
 

Argentine footballers
Living people
Expatriate footballers in Malta
Maltese Premier League players
Tarxien Rainbows F.C. players
1981 births
Liga Panameña de Fútbol players
Atlético Veragüense players
Argentine expatriates in Panama
Argentine expatriates in Malta
Juventud Antoniana footballers
General Paz Juniors footballers
Association football midfielders
Argentine expatriate footballers
Expatriate footballers in Panama
Footballers from Santa Fe, Argentina